In chemistry, a selone (also known as a selenoketone) is the structural analog of a ketone where selenium replaces oxygen. Selenium-77 is one of the isotopes of selenium that is stable and naturally occurring, so selenoketone-containing chemicals can be analyzed by nuclear magnetic resonance spectroscopy (NMR). Selones can be used as chiral derivatizing agents for 77Se-NMR. Chiral oxazolidineselones can be used for stereoselective control of aldol reactions, analogous to the Evans aldol reaction that uses oxazolidinones, which allows 77Se-NMR to be used to determine the diastereomeric ratio of the aldol product.

Selenobenzophenone reversibly dimerizes. It is known to undergo cycloaddition with 1,3-dienes in a reaction similar to the Diels-Alder reaction.

References

Organoselenium compounds
Functional groups
Selenium(−II) compounds